Pietro Francesco Galleffi (Galeffi) (1770–1837) was an Italian Cardinal.

During the Napoleonic period, he was expelled from Rome, in 1798. He was created Cardinal in 1803. He was removed to France, in 1809.

He became titular archbishop of Damasco in 1819, and was Archpriest of St. Peter's Basilica from 1820. From 1824 to 1837 he was Camerlengo. He further signed and notarized  the decree of coronation towards the Infant Jesus of Prague, paving the first image of Jesus Christ to be Pontifically crowned by a Pope. 

In 1820 he became Bishop of Albano, and in 1830 Bishop of Porto e Santa Rufina.

Galleffi is in the episcopal lineage of Pope Francis.

References

External links
Biography
Catholic Hierarchy page 

1770 births
1837 deaths
19th-century Italian cardinals
Cardinal-bishops of Albano
Cardinal-bishops of Porto
Camerlengos of the Holy Roman Church
Cardinals created by Pope Pius VII